Cochlearia danica, or Danish scurvygrass, is a flowering plant of the genus Cochlearia in the family Brassicaceae.

A salt-tolerant (normally) coastal plant which is now flourishing along roads and motorways in Europe, especially under the crash barriers in the central reservation. Its success has been attributed to its ability to survive the effects of salts distributed by gritters in winter and its small seeds being spread by the high speed of cars in the fast lane.

Full of vitamin C, it gets its name from sailors chewing it to avoid scurvy. The mauve flowers are 4-5mm in diameter.

Image gallery

References

danica
Plants described in 1753
Taxa named by Carl Linnaeus